The 2022 Lambeth London Borough Council election took place on 5 May 2022. All 63 members of Lambeth London Borough Council were elected. The elections took place alongside  local elections in the other London boroughs and elections to local authorities across the United Kingdom.

In the previous election in 2018, the Labour Party maintained its control of the council, winning 57 out of the 63 seats with the Green Party forming the principal opposition with five of the remaining six seats. The 2022 election took take place under new election boundaries, with the number of councillors remaining the same.

Labour held control of the council, winning 58 seats. The Liberal Democrats overtook the Greens as the second-largest group, winning three seats, becoming the official opposition. It also marked the first time that Liberal Democrat councillors had been elected to the council since 2010. The Conservatives lost its lone seat meaning that for the first time since the Council's founding in 1964, it will have no Conservative Councillors.

Background

History 

The thirty-two London boroughs were established in 1965 by the London Government Act 1963. They are the principal authorities in Greater London and have responsibilities including education, housing, planning, highways, social services, libraries, recreation, waste, environmental health and revenue collection. Some of the powers are shared with the Greater London Authority, which also manages passenger transport, police and fire.

Since its formation, Lambeth has generally been under Labour control apart from one period from 1968 to 1971 of Conservative control and several periods of no overall control. The council was controlled by a Liberal Democrat-Conservative coalition from 2002 to 2006, and since 2006 has continuously had a Labour majority. The Green Party won their first seat in the 2006 election, which they lost in the 2010 election. The Green Party regained their seat in the 2014 election, while the Liberal Democrats lost all their representation. In the most recent election in 2018, Labour won 57 seats with 51.7% of the vote across the borough, the Greens won five seats with 19.3% of the vote, and the Conservatives won a single seat with 12.6% of the vote. The Liberal Democrats received 12.3% of the vote but didn't win any seats.

Council term 

A Labour councillor for Coldharbour, Matt Parr, died in July 2018. A by-election to fill his seat was held on 13 September 2018, which was won by the Labour candidate Scarlett O'Hara. A Labour councillor for Thornton, Jane Edbrooke, resigned in early 2019 to take up a politically restricted job. The by-election was won by the Labour candidate Stephen Donnelly while the Liberal Democrats gained vote share to come in a strong second place. Another councillor for Thornton, Lib Peck, resigned shortly after to take up a role working for the Mayor of London, Sadiq Khan. Labour held the resulting by-election in April 2019 with candidate Nanda Manley-Browne, with the Liberal Democrats making further gains, reducing the Labour majority to nineteen votes. Labour councillor for Oval, Philip Normal, resigned in January 2022 after historic racist and sexist tweets were uncovered on his Twitter account. In February 2022, Labour councillor for Clapham Town, Christopher Wellbelove resigned due to his new job as Deputy-Lieutenant for Greater London.

As with most London boroughs, Lambeth will be electing its councillors under new boundaries decided by the Local Government Boundary Commission for England, which it produced after a period of consultation. The number of councillors will remain at 63, under new boundaries with thirteen three-councillor wards and twelve two-councillor wards.

Electoral process 
Lambeth, like other London borough councils, elects all of its councillors at once every four years. The previous election took place in 2018. The election will take place by multi-member first-past-the-post voting, with each ward being represented by two or three councillors (depending on the number of electors). Electors will have as many votes as there are councillors to be elected in their ward, with the top two or three being elected.

All registered electors (British, Irish, Commonwealth and European Union citizens) living in London aged 18 or over will be entitled to vote in the election. People who live at two addresses in different councils, such as university students with different term-time and holiday addresses, are entitled to be registered for and vote in elections in both local authorities. Voting in-person at polling stations will take place from 7:00 to 22:00 on election day, and voters will be able to apply for postal votes or proxy votes in advance of the election.

Council composition

Results summary

Council composition following the election in May 2022:

Results by ward 
Candidates shown below are confirmed candidates. An asterisk * indicates an incumbent Councillor seeking re-election.

Brixton Acre Lane 
Maria Kay was a sitting councillor for Brixton Hill ward.

Brixton North 
Nanda Manley-Browne was a sitting councillor for Thornton ward.

Brixton Rush Common 
Marcia Cameron and Ben Kind were a sitting councillors for Tulse Hill ward.

Adrian Garden was a sitting councillor for Brixton Hill ward.

Brixton Windrush 
Donatus Anyanwu and Scarlett O'Hara were sitting councillors for Coldharbour ward. 

Becca Thackray was a sitting councillor for Herne Hill ward.

Clapham Common & Abbeville 
Tim Briggs and Joanna Reynolds were sitting councillors for Clapham Common ward.

Clapham East 
Jess Leigh was a sitting councillor for Ferndale ward.

Clapham Park 
Mohammed Irfan was a sitting councillor for Ferndale ward.

Martin Tiedemann was a sitting councillor for Brixton Hill ward.

Clapham Town 
Tim Windle was a sitting councillor for Larkhall ward.

Gipsy Hill 
Pete Elliott an incumbent councillor of the ward was defeated.

Herne Hill & Loughborough Junction 
Jim Dickson and Pauline George were sitting councillors for Herne Hill ward.

Kennington 
David Amos was a sitting councillor for Prince's ward.

Jacqueline Dyer was a sitting councillor for Vassall ward.

Knight's Hill

Myatt's Fields 
Paul Gadsby and Anne-Marie Gallop were sitting councillors for Vassall ward.

Oval 
Claire Holland is a sitting councillor for Oval ward since 2014 and Council Leader since May 2021.

St Martin's 
Saleha Jaffer was previously a councillor for St Leonards ward between 2014 and 2018.

Stockwell East 
Mahamed Hashi was a sitting councillor for Stockwell ward.

Tina Valcarcel was a sitting councillor for Larkhall ward.

Stockwell West & Larkhall 
Joanne Simpson was a sitting councillor for Prince's ward.

Streatham Common & Vale 
Danny Adilypour was a sitting councillor for Streatham South ward.

Streatham Hill East 
Liz Atkins and Rezina Chowdhury were sitting councillors for Streatham Hill ward.

Streatham Hill West & Thornton 
Ed Davie was a sitting councillor for Thornton ward.

Streatham St Leonard's 
Scott Ainslie and Nicole Griffiths were sitting councillors for St Leonards ward.

Streatham Wells

Vauxhall

Waterloo & South Bank 
Ibrahim Dogus was a sitting councillor for Bishop's ward.

West Dulwich 
Fred Cowell was a sitting councillor for Thurlow Park ward.

References 

Council elections in the London Borough of Lambeth
Lambeth